KK12FM is a radio station from Sabah, Malaysia. The station features local topics among the urban population of Kota Kinabalu.

Announcers 
The current radio announcers are:
 Gee - Tick Talk with Gee (Mondays, Wednesdays, Fridays - 5-7PM)
 Amy D (also known as Aunty Patrin) - Reality Bites (Mondays, Wednesdays, Fridays - 11AM-1PM)
 Ben Uzair - Make It Happen with Ben Uzair (Tuesdays, Thursdays - 11AM-1PM, Weekends - 8-10AM)
 Apeng - Rojak Weekday (Tuesdays, Thursdays - 5-7PM)
 Asha

References

External links 
 

2017 establishments in Malaysia
Radio stations established in 2017
Radio stations in Malaysia